Jack Moore (December 26, 1959 – March 3, 1984) was an American college basketball player.  He played collegiately at Nebraska and was the 1982 Frances Pomeroy Naismith Award for the best player in the country under six feet tall.

College career
Moore, a 5'9" point guard, came to Nebraska after leading his Muncie Central High School team to an Indiana state championship in 1978.  Moore was a standout for the Cornhuskers on and off the court from 1978 to 1982.  He was a first team All-Big Eight choice as a senior and finished second nationally in free throw percentage in both his junior and years.  In the classroom, Moore made the academic all-conference team three years and was a second team Academic All-American as a senior.  Nationally, he was awarded the Frances Pomeroy Naismith Award as the country's best player under six feet tall.

For his career, Moore scored 1,204 ponts and finished his career with a .901 free throw percentage – both a Big Eight and Nebraska record.  Moore also holds the Nebraska record for free throw percentage in a season with .939 in 1981–82.

Death and legacy
After graduating from Nebraska, Moore was drafted by the Kansas City Kings in the 1982 NBA draft, however he did not play in the National Basketball Association.  He took a job as a stockbroker in North Platte, Nebraska.  On March 3, 1984, Moore died in a private plane crash returning to Nebraska from watching Muncie Central play a sectional game.

Moore was posthumously inducted into both the Nebraska and Indiana Basketball Halls of Fame.  For the 1984–85 season, the Nebraska athletic department established the Jack Moore Award, presented to the most valuable player for the Huskers each year.  The first recipient was center Dave Hoppen.

References

External links
 Indiana Basketball Hall of Fame Profile

1959 births
1984 deaths
American men's basketball players
Basketball players from Indiana
Kansas City Kings draft picks
Nebraska Cornhuskers men's basketball players
Point guards
Sportspeople from Muncie, Indiana